South Italy ( or just ) is one of the five official statistical regions of Italy used by the National Institute of Statistics (ISTAT), a first level NUTS region and a European Parliament constituency. South Italy encompasses six of the country's 20 regions:

Abruzzo
Apulia
Basilicata
Calabria
Campania
Molise

South Italy is defined only for statistical and electoral purposes. It should not be confused with the Mezzogiorno, or Southern Italy, which refers to the areas of the former Kingdom of the Two Sicilies (once including the southern half of the Italian peninsula and Sicily) with the usual addition of the Western Mediterranean island of Sardinia. The latter and Sicily form a distinct statistical region, called Insular Italy.

Economy 
The gross domestic product (GDP) of the region was 271.1 billion euros in 2018, accounting for 15.4% of Italy's economic output. The GDP per capita adjusted for purchasing power was 19,300 euros, or 64% of the EU27 average in the same year.

See also
 National Institute of Statistics (Italy)
 Italian NUTS level 1 regions:
 Northwest Italy
 Northeast Italy
 Central Italy
 Insular Italy
 Northern Italy
 Southern Italy

References

Geography of Italy
NUTS 1 statistical regions of the European Union